Curculionichthys paresi is a species of catfish in the family Loricariidae. It is a freshwater species native to South America, where it occurs in small tributaries of the Sepotuba River in Brazil. It reaches 2.6 cm (1 inch) SL.

References 

Loricariidae
Fish described in 2014